Paul Joseph Fenwick (born 25 August 1969) is a Canadian retired international soccer player. Born in England, he made 33 appearances for the Canada national team. He later worked as a physiotherapist with the Canada national team.

Club career
Fenwick played in Canada for Club Roma, Hamilton Steelers and Winnipeg Fury, in England for Birmingham City, and in Scotland for Dunfermline Athletic, St Mirren, Greenock Morton, Raith Rovers (on loan) and Hibernian. On 30 April 2012, he was inducted into the St. Catharines Sports Hall of Fame.

International career
Fenwick made his debut for Canada in a June 1994 friendly match against the Netherlands and went on to earn a total of 33 caps, scoring no goals. He has represented Canada in 6 FIFA World Cup qualification matches and played in the 1996, 2000 and the 2003 CONCACAF Gold Cups.

His final international was a November 2003 friendly match against Ireland.

Honours
Canada
 CONCACAF Gold Cup: 2000

References

External links 
 
 
 

1969 births
Living people
Footballers from Greater London
English emigrants to Canada
Naturalized citizens of Canada
Association football defenders
Canadian soccer players
CONCACAF Gold Cup-winning players
Canada men's international soccer players
St. Catharines Roma Wolves players
Hamilton Steelers (1981–1992) players
Winnipeg Fury players
Birmingham City F.C. players
Dunfermline Athletic F.C. players
St Mirren F.C. players
Greenock Morton F.C. players
Raith Rovers F.C. players
Hibernian F.C. players
Canadian National Soccer League players
Canadian Soccer League (1987–1992) players
English Football League players
Scottish Football League players
Scottish Premier League players
1993 CONCACAF Gold Cup players
1996 CONCACAF Gold Cup players
2000 CONCACAF Gold Cup players
2003 CONCACAF Gold Cup players
Canadian expatriate soccer players
Canadian expatriate sportspeople in Scotland
Canadian expatriate sportspeople in England
Kitchener Spirit players